Round Hill Park is a  county park in Allegheny County, Pennsylvania, United States. It is a part of the county's  network of nine distinct parks.

Seventeen picnic groves reflect farm culture with names like Alfalfa, Timothy, Wagon Wheel, and Quiet Acres. The exhibit farm is open every day of the year and affords tens of thousands of school students on field trips, and daily visitors, an interpretive program that revolves around the farm, and the water and food cycles of life. It also offers soccer fields and gardens.

References

External links
 Round Hill Park website

Parks in the Pittsburgh metropolitan area
Parks in Allegheny County, Pennsylvania
County parks in the United States